David McMackon (19 March 1858 – 10 December 1922) was a Canadian sports shooter. He competed at the 1908 Summer Olympics winning a silver medal in the team trap event.

References

1858 births
1922 deaths
Canadian male sport shooters
Olympic shooters of Canada
Shooters at the 1908 Summer Olympics
Olympic silver medalists for Canada
Olympic medalists in shooting
Medalists at the 1908 Summer Olympics
Sportspeople from Markham, Ontario
20th-century Canadian people